HD 108863 is a subgiant star, the primary of a binary star system  away, belonging to spectral class K0. Its age is younger than the Sun's at  billion years. The primary star is slightly enriched in heavy elements, having 115% of solar abundance. The primary star does not have detectable flare activity.

In 2014, a poorly characterized co-moving stellar companion HD 108863 B, likely a main sequence star of spectral class between F6 and G4, was discovered at a projected separation of 16.065 AU.

Planetary system
In 2011 one superjovian planet, HD 108863 b, on a nearly circular orbit around star HD 108863 was discovered utilizing the radial velocity method. The planet does not transit its host star.

References

Coma Berenices
Planetary systems with one confirmed planet
J12301991+2156537
061020
Durchmusterung objects
108863
Binary stars
K-type subgiants